Amin al-Hafez (1921–13 July 2009)  was the prime minister of Lebanon from 25 April 1973 to 21 June 1973. He was also a long-running Member of Parliament for Tripoli in the Lebanese Parliament until 1996.

Biography
Amin al-Hafez was born in 1921. He served a turbulent two-month term as Prime Minister of Lebanon after appointment by then Lebanese President Suleiman Franjieh and opposition of the Sunni leaders who refused to recognize his appointment. He resigned after just 2 months of serving, but continued representing his constituency of Tripoli in the Parliament.

He was married to Leila Osseiran who was a novelist. They married in 1948 and had a son, Ramzi, who is a journalist. Amin al-Hafez died aged 83 after a long-running battle with an undisclosed chronic illness on 13 July 2009.

References

External links

See also
Cabinet of Amin Hafez

1921 births
2009 deaths
Lebanese Sunni politicians
Prime Ministers of Lebanon
Members of the Parliament of Lebanon